The Anglican Diocese of Otukpo is one of 13 within the Anglican Province of Abuja, itself one of 14 provinces within the Church of Nigeria. The current bishop is David Bello.

Otukpo was inaugurated on 11 December, 1996.

Notes

Church of Nigeria dioceses
Dioceses of the Province of Abuja